Spencer Jeans (born 19 October 2000) is an Australian rugby union player who plays for the  in Super Rugby. His playing position is scrum-half. He was named in the Reds squad for the 2022 Super Rugby Pacific season.

Reference list

External links
itsrugby.co.uk profile

Australian rugby union players
Living people
Rugby union scrum-halves
Queensland Reds players
2000 births